Albertus most commonly refers to Albertus Magnus, a 13th-century theologian.

Albertus may also refer to:
 Albertus (given name)
 Albertus (motorcycle)
 Albertus (typeface)